Geoffrey Peter Marsland (17 May 1932 – 30 August 2016) was an English first-class cricketer and educator.

Marsland was born at Ashton-under-Lyne in June 1932. He was educated at Rossall School, before going up to Lincoln College, Oxford. While studying at Oxford, he played first-class cricket for Oxford University, making his debut against Gloucestershire at Oxford in 1953. He played first-class cricket for Oxford until 1954, making seventeen appearances. In his seventeen first-class matches, Marsland scored 448 runs at an average of 16.00 and a high score of 74, one of three half centuries he made.

After graduating from Oxford, he became a schoolmaster who taught at Eton College. Marsland died in August 2016.

References

External links

1932 births
2016 deaths
Alumni of Lincoln College, Oxford
Cricketers from Ashton-under-Lyne
English cricketers
Teachers at Eton College
Oxford University cricketers
People educated at Rossall School